Krasne Folwarczne  is a village in the administrative district of Gmina Jasionówka, within Mońki County, Podlaskie Voivodeship, in north-eastern Poland.

References

Krasne Folwarczne